Yania is a genus of harvestmen from South America.

References

Harvestmen
Arachnids of South America